Ramiro I (bef. 10078 May 1063) was the first King of Aragon from 1035 until his death, although he is sometimes described as a petty king. He would expand the nascent Kingdom of Aragon through his acquisition of territories, such as Sobrarbe and Ribagorza, and the city of Sangüesa. Sancho Ramírez, his son and successor, was King of Aragon, but also became King of Pamplona.

Biography 

Apparently born before 1007, he was the illegitimate son of Sancho III of Pamplona by his mistress Sancha of Aybar. Ramiro was reputed to have been adopted by his father's wife Muniadona after he was the only one of his father's children to come to her aid when needed, although there is no surviving record of these events and the story is probably apocryphal.

During his father's reign, he appeared as witness of royal charters starting in 1011, and was given numerous properties in the county of Aragon, and by the division of Sancho's realm on the latter's death in 1035, the county of Aragon fell to Ramiro with the title of baiulus or steward. This was part of what would prove to be a larger division: Navarre and the Basque country went to eldest half-brother García, the county of Castile was held by Ferdinand, while the counties of Sobrarbe and Ribagorza fell to Gonzalo and Ramiro received lands in Aragon to hold under García.

Ramiro's exact status is vague. He was called king by his vassals, neighbors, the church and even his sons, yet he always referred to himself simply as Ranimiro Sancioni regis filio (Ramiro, son of King Sancho). Likewise, in his two wills, he refers to his lands as having been given him in stewardship: in the first by García, and in the second by God. He is called regulus (rather than rex used for García) and quasi pro rege (acting as if king) in charters from Navarre. Due to his growing independence and the small size of his Pyrenean holdings, he is sometimes called a "petty king", Aragon a "pocket kingdom".

Ramiro sought to enlarge his lands at the expense of both the Moors and his brother, García, the King of Navarre. Shortly after the death of his father (the date variously placed from 1036 to 1043), he supported the emir of Tudela in an invasion of the Navarre. While he was defeated in the Battle of Tafalla, he still was able to gain territory, including Sanguesa, and established a state of semi-autonomy. In 1043, apparently with the approval of García, he annexed Sobrarbe and Ribagorza, previously held by his youngest legitimate half-brother, Gonzalo. This union created a pseudo-independent Aragonese state, with its capital at Jaca, that would give rise to the Kingdom of Aragon.

After annexation of Ribagorza and Sobrarbe, Ramiro began the advance from Aragon toward Huesca and Zaragoza. The first charter for the royal town of Jaca is attributed to him. It included well defined laws of protection even to non-residents, and would set an example for urban rights until late in the Middle Ages.

Ramiro died at the Battle of Graus in 1063 while trying to take the city. He was buried at the monastery of San Juan de la Peña, in Santa Cruz de la Serós.

Marriage and children

Before he was married, Ramiro had a mistress named Amuña (Amunna) with whom he had an illegitimate son, Sancho, in whom he confided the government of the county of Ribagorza. Via a son García of Aybar and Atarés, Count Sancho was grandfather of Pedro de Atarés, a candidate to succeed Alfonso the Battler.

Ramiro's first wife was Gisberga, daughter of Bernard Roger of Bigorre, on 22 August 1036. She changed her name to Ermesinda on marrying him. Together the couple had five children:

 Sancho Ramírez, his successor 
 García, Bishop of Jaca
 Sancha, who married Armengol III of Urgel in 1065
 Urraca, nun in Santa Cruz de la Serós
 Theresa, who married William Bertrand of Provence.

Ramiro's second wife was Agnes (Inés), perhaps a daughter of the Duke of Aquitaine. No children are known from this marriage.

References

Sources

 
 
 
 
 
 
 
 
 
 

1063 deaths
11th-century Aragonese monarchs
Spanish military personnel killed in action
Year of birth uncertain
Monarchs killed in action
Year of birth unknown
Burials at the Monastery of San Juan de la Peña
Illegitimate children of Spanish monarchs
Sons of emperors